Fra' Angelo de Mojana di Cologna (13 August 1905, Milan, Italy – 18 January 1988, Rome, Italy) was an Italian nobleman and Prince and Grand Master of the Sovereign Military Order of Malta from 1962 to 1988.

De Mojana was received as a Knight of Honour and Devotion in the Order of Malta 7 December 1940. He took first vows as a Knight of Justice 28 March 1950 and made his solemn profession 1 April 1957.  Throughout the 1950s De Mojana was the principal legal advisor to the Order of Malta in its negotiations with the Sacred Congregation for Religious.

De Mojana was promoted to the rank of Commander of Justice 1 January 1960 and was given the Commandery Estense Reggiana.  He was elected Grand Master 8 May 1962.

De Mojana made two official visits to France.  In November 1964 he was received by President Charles de Gaulle. On 27 April 1972 he was received at the Élysée Palace by President Georges Pompidou.  He made an official visit to Malta in June 1968. He made an official visit to Gabon in 1972.

De Mojana died of a heart attack at the Palazzo Malta 18 January 1988.

Postage stamps

Honours and awards

Foreign countries
 : Grand Cross of the Legion of Honour
 : Grand Collar of the Order of Pope Pius IX
 : Knight of the Supreme Order of Christ, 4 July 1987 (the last recipient of the order) 
 : Knight Grand Cross Decorated with the Grand Collar of the Order of Merit of the Italian Republic, 8 October 1962
 : Grand Cross of the Military Order of Christ, 21 September 1967
 : Grand Collar of the Order of Prince Henry, 2 September 1983
 : Grand Cross of the Order of Charles III, 12 July 1965

Dynasties
  House of Bourbon-Two Sicilies: Bailiff Grand Cross with Collar of the Sacred Military Constantinian Order of Saint George, 10 July 1962
  House of Habsburg-Lorraine: Knight of the Austrian Order of the Golden Fleece, 30 November 1972
  House of Romanov: Knight of the Order of St. Andrew, 1963
  House of Savoy: Knight of the Supreme Order of the Most Holy Annunciation, 1974
  House of Savoy: Knight Grand Cross of the Order of Saints Maurice and Lazarus, 1974
  House of Savoy: Knight Grand Cross of the Order of the Crown of Italy, 1974

References

External links
 Order of Malta, 1951-1962 affair

1905 births
1988 deaths
Nobility from Milan
Princes and Grand Masters of the Sovereign Military Order of Malta
Knights of Malta